XOS is an Android-based operating system developed by Hong Kong mobile phone manufacturer Infinix Mobile, a subsidiary of Transsion Holdings, exclusively for their smartphones.

XOS allows for a wide range of user customization without requiring rooting the mobile device. It was first introduced as XUI in 2015 and later as XOS in 2016. The operating system comes with utility applications that allow users to protect their privacy, improve speed, enhance experience among others. XOS comes with features like; XTheme, Scan to Recharge, Split Screen and XManager.

History
In 2015, Infinix Mobile released XUI 1.0, based on Android 5.0 "Lollipop", featuring XContacts, XTheme, XSloud and XShare. In July 2016, XOS 2.0 Chameleon was released based on Android 6.0 "Marshmallow", launching on HOT S and featuring XLauncher and fingerprint manager. An upgraded version XOS 2.2 Chameleon based on Android 7.0 "Nougat" was later launched in 2017 on Note 3 and Smart X5010. It features Scrollshot, Split Screen and Magazine Lockscreen.

In August 2017, XOS 3.0 Hummingbird was released based on Android 7.0 as also seen in XOS 2.2, launching on Zero 5, it later launched in 2018 on Hot S3 based on Android 8.0 "Oreo". An upgraded version XOS 3.2 Hummingbird based on Android 8.1 was later launched on Hot 6. It features Eye Care, Multi-Accounts and Device Tracking.

In May 2018, XOS 4.0 Honeybee was released based on Android 8.0, launching on Hot 7 and Zero 6, featuring Smart Screen Split, Notch Hiding, Scan To Recharge, Fingerprint Call Recording and Smart Text Classifier. An upgraded version XOS 4.1 Honeybee based on Android 8.1 was later launched on Hot 7 Pro.

In 2019, XOS 5.0 Cheetah was released based on Android 9.0 "Pie", launching on Hot S4 and Hot 8, featuring Privacy Protection, AI Intelligence, Smart Panel, Data Switcher and Fingerprint Reset Password. In December 2019, an upgraded version XOS 5.5 Cheetah based on Android 9.0 was released to Hot 8, featuring Game Assistant, Social Turbo, Smart Screen Lifting and Game Anti-Interference.

In February 2020, XOS 6.0 Dolphin was released based on Android 10, launching on S5 Pro, Note 7. It features Dark Mode, Digital Wellbeing, Wi-Fi Share and Smart Gesture.

See also 
 HiOS

References

Mobile operating systems